Reality Is Bad Enough is the third album by Patrick Sky, and his first for the Verve Forecast label.

Track listing
All tracks composed by Patrick Sky; except where indicated

Side one
"She's Up for Grabs" – 2:46
"Children's Song" – 2:37
"Silly Song" – 2:18
"Sometimes I Wonder" – 3:39
"I Don't Feel That's Real" – 3:27
"Enjoy, Enjoy" * – 2:47

Side two
"Follow the Longhaired Lady" – 2:51
"The Loving Kind" – 3:22
"The Dance of Death" – 3:21
"Modern Major General" (W. S. Gilbert, Arthur Sullivan; adapted by Patrick Sky) – 3:35
"Jimmy Clay" – 4:31

Personnel
Produced and arranged by Barry Kornfeld
(*) Arranged by Stuart Scharf
Recording Engineer: Richard Anderson 
Director of Engineering: Val Valentin 
Cover Photo: Bob Campbell 
Art Direction: David Krieger
All selections composed by Patrick Sky, except "Modern Major General" (adapted from a Gilbert and Sullivan song) 
All, selections published by Rabelaisian Music, Inc. (BMI)

References

1968 albums
Patrick Sky albums
Verve Forecast Records albums